Spicheren is a commune in the Moselle department in Grand Est in north-eastern France. It is located on the German border, lying next to the city of Saarbrücken.

See also
 Communes of the Moselle department
 Battle of Spicheren

References

External links
 

Communes of Moselle (department)